Mehran Gorbanpour (born 11 May 1995 in Tabriz) is an Iranian footballer who currently plays for Machine Sazi.

Club career statistics

He started his career with Tractor F.C. in 2015–16 Iran Pro League and played first match for his team against Gostaresh Foolad

References

1995 births
Living people
Iranian footballers
Tractor S.C. players
Sportspeople from Tabriz
Machine Sazi F.C. players
Association football forwards